Celia Pacquola (born 12 February 1983) is an Australian comedian, writer, presenter and actor who performs predominantly in Australia and the United Kingdom.

Early life
Pacquola is a third child, and her parents separated when she was eighteen. She is a descendant of John Rae.

Career
She began doing stand-up comedy in 2006.

Radio
Pacquola has written and appeared on Australian and British radio, presenting Red Hot Go and Fox Summer Breakfast on Fox FM and The Comedy Hour on ABC Radio. She has written for and appeared on BBC Radio 4 shows, including Shappi Talk, What's So Funny?, It's Your Round, The Headset, The Unbelievable Truth, and Britain Versus the World.

Television
Pacquola has written for and performed in Good News Week and Laid. She appeared in and co-wrote the first episode of the second season of It's a Date. She has made acting appearances in ABC TV series Utopia as well as The Beautiful Lie, winning an AACTA Award for "best guest or supporting actress in a television drama".  In 2016, she and Luke McGregor wrote and performed in Rosehaven. Rosehaven won the 2017 AWGIE Award for Best Comedy script.

In 2020, Pacquola won the seventeenth season of Dancing with the Stars Australia and received A$50,000 for her charity, the Safe Steps Family Violence and Support Centre.

Other shows she has performed in, both in Australia and the UK, include Rove, The Project, Sleuth 101, Celebrity Name Game, Talkin' 'Bout Your Generation, The Hundred with Andy Lee, Would I Lie to You? Australia, Spicks and Specks, The Weekly with Charlie Pickering, Have You Been Paying Attention?, Hughesy, We Have a Problem, The Rob Brydon Show, Russell Howard's Good News, Live At The Apollo, and Never Mind The Buzzcocks.

In 2021, Pacquola was the subject of the first episode of the twelfth season of the SBS documentary series Who Do You Think You Are?, which explored her family's ancestral history.

Live performances
Pacquola has written and performed live shows since 2007. Her 2009 show Am I Strange? was performed at the Edinburgh Festival Fringe and the Melbourne International Comedy Festival, where it won Best Comedy and Critics Award for Best Australian Act. She performed in 2009 at the Sydney Opera House with This Was The Year That Was. The following year, she showcased Flying Solos at the Edinburgh Festival Fringe and the Melbourne International Comedy Festival and in 2012, returned with Delayed.

She has been nominated for and won a number of awards, including best first-time entrant (Raw Recruit Prize) at the Raw Comedy Awards in 2006.

In 2016, Pacquola hosted the Oxfam Gala for the Melbourne International Comedy Festival.

In 2018, she won the Helpmann Award for Best Comedy Performer for her stand-up comedy show All Talk. In 2019, Pacquola appeared as J. G. (Jenny) Milford in the Sydney Theatre Company's production of Oriel Gray's The Torrents. At the 2020 ARIA Music Awards, she was nominated for Best Comedy Release for her album All Talk.

Film
Pacquola's first movie role was in the 2018 New Zealand romantic comedy The Breaker Upperers alongside Madeleine Sami and Jackie van Beek, both of whom wrote and directed the film.

Personal life
Pacquola openly talks about her anxiety and depression.

She gave birth to her first child, with partner Dara Munnis, in 2022.

Selected filmography

References

External links

 
 

1983 births
Living people
AACTA Award winners
Australian film actresses
Australian stage actresses
Australian television actresses
Australian women comedians
Helpmann Award winners
21st-century Australian actresses
21st-century Australian comedians